Holley Mangold (born December 22, 1989) is an American sportsperson from Dayton, Ohio. She was a member of the 2012 U.S. Olympic Team and competed in the superheavyweight division of the Olympic weightlifting competition. She has also appeared on The Biggest Loser.

Early life
Mangold is the sister of NFL center Nick Mangold.

Mangold played high school football at Archbishop Alter High School on the offensive line and was the first female non-kicker to play in an Ohio Division III high-school football game. She dropped out of  Ursuline College in May 2010; she had attended Ursuline on a track scholarship.

Career
Mangold began weightlifting in 2008.

2012 London Olympics
Mangold's personal weightlifting record total is 255 kilos (562.2 pounds) from a 110 kilo (242.5 pounds) snatch and 145 kilo (319.7 pounds) clean and jerk. That aggregate total landed her one of two spots on the 2012 U.S. Olympic Team. However, before she went to London to compete, Mangold tore a tendon in her wrist and required three cortisone shots before the super heavyweight competition. Mangold placed tenth out of the 14 weightlifters in her division.

Television
A video documentary about Mangold's life premiered on MTV's "True Life" on June 30, 2011 in an episode entitled "I'm the Big Girl."

Mangold was a participant in The Biggest Loser: Second Chances 2, the 15th season of the TV series, The Biggest Loser. She was eliminated after seven episodes.

On June 1, 2015, an Instagram video of Mangold spoofing J. J. Watt's box jumps went viral.

References

External links

1989 births
Living people
Sportspeople from Dayton, Ohio
American female weightlifters
Olympic weightlifters of the United States
Female players of American football
Weightlifters at the 2012 Summer Olympics
American sportswomen
Weightlifters at the 2015 Pan American Games
Pan American Games competitors for the United States
21st-century American women
20th-century American women